Ricardo Souza Silva or simply Ricardinho (born November 26, 1975, in São Paulo), is a Brazilian attacking midfielder.

Club statistics

Honours
 São Paulo
 Campeonato Paulista: 2000

Paulista
 Copa do Brasil: 2005

 Vitória
 Campeonato Baiano: 2008

 Sport
 Campeonato Pernambucano: 2010

External links

 CBF

1975 births
Living people
Brazilian footballers
Footballers from São Paulo
Brazilian expatriate footballers
Expatriate footballers in Japan
Campeonato Brasileiro Série A players
Campeonato Brasileiro Série B players
Campeonato Brasileiro Série C players
J1 League players
J2 League players
Association football midfielders
Nacional Atlético Clube (SP) players
Nagoya Grampus players
Shonan Bellmare players
São Paulo FC players
Kawasaki Frontale players
Coritiba Foot Ball Club players
Joinville Esporte Clube players
C.D. Nacional players
Fortaleza Esporte Clube players
Portimonense S.C. players
Paulista Futebol Clube players
Sport Club Internacional players
Sociedade Esportiva Palmeiras players
Botafogo de Futebol e Regatas players
Esporte Clube Vitória players
Guaratinguetá Futebol players
Avaí FC players
Vila Nova Futebol Clube players
Sport Club do Recife players
Grêmio Esportivo Brasil players
Bangu Atlético Clube players
Independente Futebol Clube players
Esporte Clube Água Santa players
Nacional Atlético Clube Sociedade Civil players
Associação Atlética Portuguesa (Santos) players